Gawler  is a town in South Australia on the Gawler River. Gawler may also refer to:

People
Gawler (surname), people whose surname is Gawler
George Gawler (1795–1869), second Governor of South Australia

Places

South Australia
Gawler bioregion, a bioregion in South Australia
Gawler Craton, a geological formation in central South Australia
Gawler Place, Adelaide, a street in the Adelaide city centre
Gawler Ranges (disambiguation), places associated with the Gawler Ranges in South Australia
Gawler Reach, a section of the Port River at Birkenhead, South Australia
Gawler River (South Australia) just north of the bounds of the Adelaide metropolitan area
Gawler River, South Australia, a small town on the north bank of the Gawler River
Town of Gawler, local government area containing the town and suburbs

Tasmania
Gawler, Tasmania, a suburb in the local government area of Central Coast Council (Tasmania)

Railways
Gawler railway line between Adelaide and the town of Gawler
Gawler Central railway station
Gawler Oval railway station
Gawler Racecourse railway station
Gawler railway station

See also

Gawler Bypass, road near the town of Gawler
Gawler River (disambiguation)
Port Gawler (disambiguation)
Wheal Gawler, former mine in Mount Osmond, South Australia